The List of United Kingdom Speedway Pairs Champions is the list of teams and riders who have won the United Kingdom's Pairs Championship that corresponded to the relevant league at the time. The list is split into three divisions, the top tier, the second tier and third tier, all three divisions have been known in various guises such as National League, Premier League, Elite League and many more. This list gives a complete listing of the winners for each season.

During some years there was only one or two divisions.

Pairs Champions (chronological order)

Tier One
British League Pairs Championship 1976–1987
Elite League Pairs Championship 2004–2011
SGB Premiership Pairs Championship 2017–present

Tier Two
British League Division Two Pairs Championship 1975-1994
Premier League Pairs Championship 1997–2016
SGB Championship Pairs Championship 2017–present

Tier Three
National League Pairs Championship 2009–present

List of Winners

References

Lists of motorsport champions
Speedway in the United Kingdom